The Down Recorder is a weekly newspaper published in Downpatrick, County Down, Northern Ireland every Wednesday. It is owned by W.Y. Crichton & Co.

History 
The paper, then known as The Downpatrick Recorder, was first published on 31 December 1836. It was the first newspaper to be published in the town, and was owned by Conway Pilson, the son of a local historian.

At that time, news from London and abroad came by boat to Belfast in the evening. However, the boat rested for 12 hours at Newry,  from Downpatrick. Pilson organised a horse relay to bring the news from there so he could publish it before any rival papers.

The paper was renamed The Down Recorder in 1878 to reflect its wider circulation.

In 1964, the production moved from the original offices in Irish Street to a former Post Office building on Church Street. In 1966, the actually printing was moved to more modern facilities in Portadown.

References

External links
 Down Recorder

Newspapers published in Northern Ireland
Downpatrick
Mass media in County Down